Even Granås (born 1977) is a drummer and guitarist from Hell, Norway.

He is a member of the bands Sugarfoot and The Pink Moon, and has also been a member of The Moving Oos, New Violators, Sanderfinger, The International Tussler Society, Thrush, Ryanbanden and I Love Wynona.

References

1977 births
Norwegian drummers
Male drummers
Norwegian guitarists
Norwegian male guitarists
Living people
21st-century Norwegian guitarists
21st-century Norwegian drummers
21st-century Norwegian male musicians